The United States Internal Revenue Code contains a limited number of specific statutory provisions excluding from income economic benefits that would otherwise constitute gross income under the Code.  IRC § 108 constitutes one such exclusion.  Section 108 excludes discharge of indebtedness from gross income under certain specified conditions, such as when the discharge occurs in bankruptcy or when the taxpayer is insolvent.   Under ordinary taxation principles, discharge of debt would clearly fall within the broad definition of gross income provided by the Code.  Section 108 thus provides a measure of relief for certain taxpayers who find themselves facing serious financial difficulties.

Unfortunately for financially troubled taxpayers, exclusion under § 108 comes at a cost.  Under § 108(b)(1), "the amount excluded from gross income under … subsection (a)(1) shall be applied to reduce the tax attributes of the taxpayer".  Thus, excluding income under § 108 requires a taxpayer to postpone his or her tax liability by decreasing dollar-for-dollar certain "tax attributes" that would otherwise be available to offset future income.   Id. § (b)(3)(A).

Section 108(b)(2) provides the general rule that taxpayers must reduce seven specified tax attributes in the following order.  These attributes are:

 Net operating losses.
 General business credits.
 Minimum tax credits.
 Capital loss carryovers.
 Basis of property.
 Passive activity loss and credit carryovers.
 Foreign tax credit carryovers.

Taxpayers ay elect to apply any or all of the excluded income to reduce basis in property before reducing another attribute if they would be better situated preserving loss carryovers until the next taxable year.  To the extent that a taxpayer applies excluded income for purposes other than basis reduction under the election, the taxpayer must follow the prescribed order.  Regardless of whether a taxpayer makes an election, any reductions in basis are governed by § 1017.

Notes

Taxation in the United States